Adastria Mito Arena (アダストリアみとアリーナ) is a multi-use indoor arena  in Mito, Ibaraki, Japan. It is the largest basketball court in the Prefecture.

History 

The former arena, Ibaraki Prefectural Sports Center Arena built in 1963 was closed at August 31st, 2015 because of its deterioration. At the next day, the sports park was transferred from Ibaraki Prefecture to Mito City, and a new arena was built at the same place.  In October 2018 Mito-originated Adastria Co., Ltd. purchased the naming rights, and the name was changed to Adastria Mito Arena.

Facilities
Main arena - 3,255sqm, 69m×46m×15m
Sub arena - 997sqm, 38m×25m×12.5m

Attendance records
The record for a basketball game is 5,041, set on April 6, 2019, when the Gunma Crane Thunders defeated the Ibaraki Robots.

References

External links

cyberdyne Ibaraki Robots
Sports venues in Ibaraki Prefecture
Indoor arenas in Japan
Basketball venues in Japan